Michael Fitzpatrick is an American Cello-Soloist, 5-string Electric Cellist, Composer, Producer, and Recording Artist. He is the recipient of 
The Prince Charles Award for Musical Excellence conferred by His Royal Highness The Prince of Wales – now His Majesty King Charles III. Sir George Martin, Producer of The Beatles, stated: "Michael Fitzpatrick is beyond a marvelous musician, and I could not agree with him more: Music is the only thingthat can change the world." 
He has shared the stage with Nobel Peace laureate His Holiness The XIVth Dalai Lama for the past three decades, performing the Musical Keynotes to set the tone for His Holiness' Public Talks and Teachings worldwide. His Holiness stated: “The emotion induced by Michael Fitzpatrick’s music is so powerful, it seems almost verbalized. His sound is Clear Light.”

Early years
Fitzpatrick was born on December 5, 1964 in Columbus, Ohio to a family of Jewish-Polish, Jewish-Russian, Catalan, and Irish musicians and artists. His maternal grandmother, Rose Bein Lerman, was solo pianist with The Louisville Orchestra at age 14, and later was vocal coach to Metropolitan Opera star and cantor Jan Peerce. Fitzpatrick's Jewish-Polish relative, world-renowned violin virtuoso Bronislaw Huberman, was the Founder of the Israel Philharmonic, which gave its world-premiere concert in 1936 under the baton of Arturo Toscanini. His father, of Catalan and Irish descent, was an artist and professor of art. His sister, Josephine, is Co-Principal Violist of The Barcelona Symphony Orchestra. His sister Tamara Fitzpatrick was photographer at The White House (Special Assignment). His cousin, the late Robert Bein, was a Founder of Bein & Fushi, the pre-eminent rare violin dealer in the world. His cousin Joe Bein carries on the family tradition at Bein & Company in Chicago. 

Fitzpatrick formal musical studies were at The Cleveland Institute of Music, Northwestern University School of Music, Yale University School of Music, and New York University. He holds the Bachelor's Degree and Certificate in Performance from Northwestern University, and the Master of Arts from New York University.  His principal cello studies were with the renowned pedagogue and soloist Scott Ballantyne, Personal Teaching Assistant to Leonard Rose at The Juilliard School. He studied as well with Robert Gardner, Yehuda Hanani, Rodney Farrar, Alan Harris, Susannah Onwood, Frank Church, Ronald Leonard, Hans Jorgen Jensen, and in Master Classes with Leonard Rose, Mstislav Rostropovich, and Albert Catell, Principal Cellist of The Israel Philharmonic Orchestra.

Career
Fitzpatrick has performed in concerts across Europe, the former Soviet Union, the Middle East, India, Australia, and numerous tours across the United States and Canada. He has performed as cello soloist at the Hollywood Bowl, Lincoln Center, Town Hall, and the Aspen Music Festival.

Film scores

Based in Los Angeles and New York, Fitzpatrick performed as cello soloist on the film score for Journey from Zanskar by Frederick Marx, the director of Hoop Dreams.

Fitzpatrick's cello solos are also featured in the films “One” and Earthlings (film) narrated by Joaquin Phoenix, in composer Laura Karpman's soundtrack to PBS Craft in America, and in Christopher Guest’s HBO series Family Tree (TV series), scored by CJ Vanston.

Tuning the Planet
Fitzpatrick has worked musically with the 14th Dalai Lama on Compassion: Tuning the Planet, which was created “with the intent to induce a feeling of peace in everyone who listens.”

Social activism
Fitzpatrick was Music Director and served on the Board of Advisors of the Aspen Institute’s Global Forum on Cultural Diplomacy during its tenure. He is the recipient of The Aspen Fellowship, the Aspen Music Festival's highest honor.
He is the Founder of Millenia Music, which brings healing music to people in need worldwide. 

Fitzpatrick serves as a music advisor to the Dalai Lama Foundation and as music director of Muhammad Ali Humanitarian Awards.

Personal

Fitzpatrick lives in Los Angeles, California.

References

External links

Living people
1964 births
Artists from Los Angeles
Musicians from Kentucky
Yale University alumni
New York University alumni